Bandwings, or band-winged grasshoppers, are the subfamily Oedipodinae of grasshoppers classified under the family Acrididae. They have a worldwide distribution and were originally elevated to full family status as the Oedipodidae.  Many species primarily inhabit xeric weedy fields, and some are considered to be important locusts:
 Locusta migratoria: the migratory locust
 Chortoicetes terminifera: the Australian plague locust
 Locustana pardalina the brown locust

These grasshoppers often have colorful hindwings that may be yellow or red and edged with black. Others have black hindwings with pale edges, and a few species (including the most economically important ones) have clear hindwings. The arolium is extremely small or absent.

Defense 
When bandwings feel safe, they appear drab. When they feel threatened, they leap out to reveal bold and bright colors. Some predators might even mistake the blue-winged grasshopper for a butterfly. But when the predator looks for the grasshopper, it is hiding in the grass. Bandwings continue this process if the predator tries to attack them.

Tribes and genera
The Orthoptera Species File lists the following:

Tribe Acrotylini 
Auth. Shumakov 1963; distribution: Africa, Europe, Asia, Australia

 Acrotylus Fieber, 1853
 Pusana Uvarov, 1940

Tribe Anconiini 
Auth. Otte, 1995; distribution: N. America (monotypic)
 Anconia Scudder, 1876

Tribe Arphiini 
Auth. Otte, 1995; distribution: N. America

 Arphia Stål, 1873
 Lactista Saussure, 1884 (synonym Rehnita)
 Leuronotina Hebard, 1932
 Tomonotus Saussure, 1861

Tribe Bryodemini 
Auth. Bei-Bienko 1930; distribution: mostly central Asia

 Andrea Mishchenko, 1989
 Angaracris Bei-Bienko, 1930
 Bryodema Fieber, 1853
 Bryodemacris Benediktov, 1998
 Bryodemella Yin, 1982 (Eastern Europe and temperate Asia)
 Compsorhipis Saussure, 1889
 Uvaroviola Bei-Bienko, 1930

Tribe Chortophagini 
Auth. Otte, 1984; distribution: N. America

 Chimarocephala Scudder, 1875
 Chortophaga Saussure, 1884
 Encoptolophus Scudder, 1875
 Nebulatettix Gómez, Lightfoot & Miller, 2012
 Shotwellia Gurney, 1940

Tribe Epacromiini 
Auth. Brunner von Wattenwyl 1893; distribution: Africa, Europe, Asia through to New Caledonia

 Aiolopus Fieber, 1853
 Demirsoyus Sirin & Çiplak, 2004
 Epacromius Uvarov, 1942
 Heteropternis Stål, 1873
 Hilethera Uvarov, 1923
 Jasomenia Bolívar, 1914
 Paracinema Fischer, 1853
 Parahilethera Zheng & Ren, 2007
 Platypygius Uvarov, 1942

Tribe Hippiscini 
Auth. Otte, 1984; distribution: Americas

 Agymnastus Scudder, 1897
 Camnula Stål, 1873
 Cratypedes Scudder, 1876
 Hadrotettix Scudder, 1876
 Heliastus Saussure, 1884
 Hippiscus Saussure, 1861 (monotypic)
 Leprus Saussure, 1861
 Pardalophora Saussure, 1884
 Sticthippus Scudder, 1892
 Xanthippus (grasshopper) Saussure, 1884

Tribe Locustini 
Auth. Kirby, 1825; distribution: Africa, Europe, Asia, Australia

subtribe Locustina Kirby, 1825
 Locusta Linnaeus, 1758 (monotypic)
 Oedaleus Fieber, 1853
 Psophus Fieber, 1853 - monotypic Psophus stridulus
subtribe undetermined
 Brunnerella Saussure, 1888
 Chifanicus Benediktov, 2001
 Gastrimargus Saussure, 1884
 Grammoscapha Uvarov, 1942
 Locustana Uvarov, 1921
 Pternoscirta Saussure, 1884
 Ptetica Saussure, 1884
 Pycnodictya Stål, 1873
 Pyrgodera Fischer von Waldheim, 1846
 Scintharista Saussure, 1884

Tribe Macherocerini 
Auth. Otte, 1995; distribution: N. America (monotypic)
 Machaerocera Saussure, 1859

Tribe Oedipodini 
Auth. Walker, 1871; distribution: N. Africa, Europe, Asia

 Celes (grasshopper) Saussure, 1884
 Mioscirtus Saussure, 1888
 Ochyracris Zheng, 1991
 Oedipoda Latreille, 1829
 Oedipodacris Willemse, 1932

Tribe Parapleurini 
Auth. Brunner von Wattenwyl 1893 (synonym  Parapleuri); distribution: N. America, Europe, Asia

 Ceracris Walker, 1870
 Ceracrisoides Liu, 1985
 Formosacris Willemse, 1951
 Mecostethus Fieber, 1852
 Parapleurodes Ramme, 1941
 Stethophyma Fischer, 1853
 Yiacris Zheng & Chen, 1993

Tribe Psinidiini 
Auth. Otte, 1984; distribution: N. America

 Derotmema Scudder, 1876
 Hippopedon Saussure, 1861 (synonym Platylactista)
 Mestobregma Scudder, 1876
 Metator McNeill, 1901
 Psinidia Stål, 1873
 Trachyrhachys Scudder, 1876
 Trepidulus McNeill, 1901

Tribe Sphingonotini 
Auth. Johnston, 1956; distribution: worldwide, esp. Africa, Europe, Asia

 Conipoda Saussure, 1884
 Cophotylus Krauss, 1902
 Eusphingoderus Bei-Bienko, 1950
 Eusphingonotus Bey-Bienko, 1950
 Heliopteryx Uvarov, 1914
 Helioscirtus Saussure, 1884
 Hyalorrhipis Saussure, 1884
 Microtes Scudder, 1900
 Phaeonotus Popov, 1951
 Pseudoceles Bolívar, 1899
 Quadriverticis Zheng, 1999
 Sphingoderus Bei-Bienko, 1950
 Sphingonotus Fieber, 1852 - type species: Sphingonotus caerulans
 Tetramerotropis Saussure, 1888
 Thalpomena Saussure, 1884
 Vosseleriana Uvarov, 1924

Tribe Trilophidiini 
Auth. Shumakov 1963; distribution: Africa, Asia (monotypic tribe)

 Trilophidia Stål, 1873

Tribe Trimerotropini 
Auth. Blatchley, 1920; distribution: Americas
 Circotettix Scudder, 1876
 Conozoa Saussure, 1884
 Dissosteira Scudder, 1876
 Spharagemon Scudder, 1875
 Trimerotropis Stål, 1873

Tribe Tropidolophini 
Auth. Otte, 1995; distribution: N. America (monotypic tribe)

 Tropidolophus Thomas, 1873 - monotypic Tropidolophus formosus

Genera incertae sedis 

 Angaracrisoides Gong & Zheng, 2003
 Asphingoderus Bei-Bienko, 1950
 Atympanum Yin, 1982
 Aulocaroides Werner, 1913
 Aurilobulus Yin, 1979
 Austroicetes Uvarov, 1925
 Brancsikellus Berg, 1899
 Chloebora Saussure, 1884
 Chondronotulus Uvarov, 1956
 Chortoicetes Brunner von Wattenwyl, 1893
 Crinita Dirsh, 1949
 Cyanicaudata Yin, 1979
 Diraneura Scudder, 1897
 Dittopternis Saussure, 1884
 Elmisia Dirsh, 1949
 Eokingdonella Yin, 1984
 Eremoscopus Bei-Bienko, 1951
 Eurysternacris Chopard, 1947
 Fitzgeraldia Uvarov, 1952
 Flatovertex Zheng, 1981
 Granada (insect) Koçak & Kemal, 2008
 Homoeopternis Uvarov, 1953
 Humbe (insect) Bolívar, 1882
 Jinabia Uvarov, 1952
 Kinshaties Zheng, 1977
 Leptopternis Saussure, 1884
 Mecistopteryx Saussure, 1888
 Morphacris Walker, 1870
 Nepalacris Balderson & Yin, 1987
 Oreacris Bolívar, 1911
 Promesosternus Yin, 1982
 Pseudaiolopus Hollis, 1967
 Pycnocrania Uvarov, 1941
 Pycnodella Descamps, 1965
 Pycnodictya Stål, 1873
 Pycnostictus Saussure, 1884
 Qualetta Sjöstedt, 1921
 Rashidia Uvarov, 1933
 Tibetacris Chen, 1964
 Tmetonota Saussure, 1884
 Zimbabwea Miller, 1949
 †Mioedipoda Stidham & Stidham, 2000
 †Nymphacrida Zhang, Sun & Zhang, 1994
 †Oedemastopoda Zhang, Sun & Zhang, 1994

The genus Cibolacris was originally placed in Oedipodinae, and later moved to Gomphocerinae.  The genus Stethophyma is traditionally included in Oedipodinae, but North American authors in particular sometimes place it in the Gomphocerinae or Acridinae.   Some authors place all members of Oedipodinae within the subfamily Acridinae, and there has been much confusion and debate about the limits and relationships of the two subfamilies.

References

External links